Michel Esdras Bernier,  (September 28, 1841 – July 27, 1921) was a Canadian politician.

Born in St-Hyacinthe, Canada East, he was a notary and businessman before being elected to the House of Commons of Canada for the riding of St. Hyacinthe in 1882. A Liberal, he was re-elected in 1887, 1891, 1896, and 1900. From 1900 to 1904, he was the Minister of Inland Revenue. From 1904 to 1914, he was the Deputy Commissioner of the Board of Railway Commissioners and Transport Commissioners.

Electoral record 

By-election: On Mr. Bernier being appointed Controller of Inland Revenue, 22 June 1900

References

 

 Michel Esdras Bernier fonds - Library and Archives Canada

1841 births
1921 deaths
Liberal Party of Canada MPs
Members of the House of Commons of Canada from Quebec
Members of the King's Privy Council for Canada